Only a Viennese Woman Kisses Like That is a 1928 German silent film directed by Arthur Bergen and starring Werner Fuetterer, Grete Graal, and Erna Morena.

It was made at the Emelka Studios in Munich. The film's sets were designed by the art directors Gustav A. Knauer and Willy Schiller.

Cast

References

Bibliography

External links

1928 films
Films of the Weimar Republic
Films directed by Arthur Bergen
German silent feature films
Bavaria Film films
Films shot at Bavaria Studios
German black-and-white films